0E (zero E) or 0-E may refer to:

0E, or zero East, longitude for the Prime Meridian
0e, or On30 European notation for 0 scale using 16.5mm track
0 emission, or Zero emission
Zero Emissions Research and Initiatives
Zero-emissions vehicle
0 energy or Zero energy
zero energy building (ZEB), a building's use with zero net energy consumption and zero carbon emissions
Zero-energy Universe concept that the Universe's total amount of energy is exactly zero
0 element, or Zero element, one of several generalizations of the number zero to other algebraic structures

See also
OE (disambiguation)
E0 (disambiguation)